Ernest Simon  (born 22 June 1985) is a Nigerian footballer, who currently plays for Eledi FC Lagos.

Playing career
He began his career by Gombe United F.C. before moved in January 2008 to Atlantis FC.

References

External links
 Atlantis Profile
 Allsoccerplayers Profile

1985 births
Living people
Nigerian footballers
Atlantis FC players
Gombe United F.C. players
Nigerian expatriates in Finland
Association football midfielders